Michael Georg Jakosits (born 21 January 1970) is a German sports shooter and Olympic champion. He won the gold medal in the 10 metre running target at the 1992 Summer Olympics in Barcelona. He placed fifth at the 2004 Summer Olympics. Jakosits was born in Zweibrücken, Rheinland-Pfalz.

References

1970 births
German male sport shooters
Shooters at the 1992 Summer Olympics
Shooters at the 1996 Summer Olympics
Shooters at the 2000 Summer Olympics
Shooters at the 2004 Summer Olympics
People from Homburg, Saarland
Olympic shooters of Germany
Olympic gold medalists for Germany
Living people
Olympic medalists in shooting
Medalists at the 1992 Summer Olympics
Sportspeople from Saarland
21st-century German people
20th-century German people